To dig is to remove solid material from a surface.

Dig or DIG may also refer to:

Arts, entertainment, and media

Films
 Dig!, a 2004 documentary
 Dig, a 1971 animated film by John Hubley and Faith Hubley
 Dig, a 2011 short film by Joshua Caldwell
 Dig (2022 film), a film by K. Asher Levin

Music

Groups and labels
 Dig (band), an American rock band
 Directions In Groove, or DIG, a defunct Australian acid jazz band

Albums
 Dig (Adam Again album), or the title song
 Dig (Boz Scaggs album)
 Dig (I Mother Earth album)
 Dig (Miles Davis album), or the title song
 Dig (Toshiko Akiyoshi album)
 Dig?, by Bill Bruford's Earthworks

Songs
 "Dig" (composition), a jazz standard by Miles Davis
 "Dig" (Mark Lizotte song), 1999
 "Dig" (Incubus song)
 "Dig" (Mudvayne song)
 "Dig", from Down to the Bone by Quiet Riot
 “Dig”, a song from the album Punk In Drublic by the American Punk rock band NOFX

Periodicals
 Dig (magazine), a children's magazine associated with the Archaeological Institute of America
 Weekly Dig, an alternative newsweekly in Boston, Massachusetts

Other arts, entertainment, and media
 Dig (TV series), an American action series
 ABC DiG, an Australian digital radio service
 Carl Diggler, a fictional American journalist whose nickname and column are called "The Dig"

Computing and technology
 dig (command), a Unix network utility for querying DNS name servers
 DIG, a filename extension referring to either Digilink or Sound Designer files

Law and law enforcement
 DIG, a writ of certiorari that is dismissed as improvidently granted (DIGged), in the Procedures of the Supreme Court of the United States
 Deputy inspector general of police (DIG Police), a high-ranking senior Indian, Pakistani or Sri Lankan Police Service officer
 Deputy Inspector General of Prisons (DIG Prisons), a high-ranking senior Indian or Pakistani provincial Prison Service officer

Transport
 Digby and Sowton railway station, Devon, England; National Rail station code DIG
 Diqing Shangri-La Airport, Yunnan, China; IATA airport code DIG

Other uses
 Archaeological dig, an excavation
 Volleyball dig, often shortened to "dig"
 Dig (woreda), a district of Somali Region, Ethiopia
 DIG: an archaeological adventure, an educational resource in York, England
 Digoxigenin or dig, a plant-produced steroid used for biochemical "tagging"
 Dig (restaurant), an American fast-casual restaurant chain
 Disablement Income Group, a British disability rights organization

See also
 The Dig (disambiguation)
 Big Dig, a megaproject in Boston, Massachusetts, U.S.
 Deeg, a city in Rajasthan, India
 Digg, a community-based popularity website
 Digger (disambiguation)